Slavia Friulana, which means Friulian Slavia, is a small mountainous region in northeastern Italy and it is so called because of its Slavic population which settled here in the 8th century AD. The territory is located in the Italian region of Friuli Venezia Giulia, between the town of Cividale del Friuli (not included) and the Slovenian border.

Extent 
The term Slavia Friulana could possibly be used to refer to all Friulian territories with a Slavic presence, including the municipalities of Lusevera, Taipana, Torreano, Resia and the mountainous areas of the municipalities of Tarcento, Nimis, Attimis, Faedis, Prepotto and Montenars. Despite that, in the last decades the name has been used to indicate the area also known as Valli del Natisone (Natisone Valleys) which was called Antro in the Middle Ages and then Schiavonìa during the Venetian domination: nowadays, the area is divided into the municipalities of San Pietro al Natisone, San Leonardo, Pulfero, Drenchia, Grimacco, Stregna, Savogna.

Name 
Since the beginning of the 8th century AD (c. 720), Slavic people settled in this area and in the Middle Ages they would have been called Sclavons. In the early 16th century, the Venetian authorities dubbed this border region of their Republic as Schiavonia Veneta, meaning "Venetian Slav-land". The Venetian words Schiavoni and Schiavonia were general terms used for all South Slavic peoples with which they came in direct contact, Slovenes as well as for Croats and Serbs from Dalmatia. The corresponding Latin term, Sclavonia, was also the source for the name of the region of Slavonia in present-day Croatia. In 1884 the local historian Carlo Podrecca named the area Slavia Italiana.

In Slovene, the traditional term has been Beneška Slovenija, which is a literal translation of Schiavonia Veneta. Until the early 19th century, there was no distinction between the terms "Slav" and "Slovene" in Slovenian. However, from the times of Romantic nationalism onward, the term Slovenija, which had been sporadically used to denote lands inhabited by Slovenes/Slavs, took over a new meaning, denoting the idea of modern Slovenia. The old term  Beneška Slovenija was thus assimilated to a new meaning, as its name now meant "Venetian Slovenia". As a more neutral colloquial term, the name Benečija came into usage, which however also means Veneto in Slovene. 
	
After World War I, as soon as the Italian kingdom expanded its borders eastwards (including slavophone territories in Istria and in the so-called Habsburgic Illyrian kingdom), the region started to be commonly called Slavia Friulana instead of a generic Slavia Italiana.

History

Early periods

In the early 8th century Slavic tribes settled within the border of the Lombard Duchy of Forumiulii. Paulus Diaconus, a Lombard historian at the court of Charlemagne, mentioned the local Slavs from the region in his magnum opus Historia Langobardorum. They were incorporated into the Frankish Empire and Christianized maybe by missionaries from Aquileia, one of the most important centers of the Roman Catholic Church in Northern Italy.

From the 9th century onward, the region belonged first to the Duchy of Friuli and later to the Patriarchate of Aquileia. In 1420 the Patriarchate of Aquileia was invaded by the Republic of Venice.

The Venetian domination
The Venetian authorities decided to absorb the "gastaldia di Antro" in the Cividale's one, but at the same time they gave the local Slavs a remarkable autonomy. In fact, the territory was structured in two co-valleys (Antro and Merso) represented by their people's assemblies called arenghi; each co-valley had also the right to elect its own judges and its own tribunals (banche) whose judiciary power was extended in the villages that weren't object of feudal investitures; the whole Schiavonia had important tax benefits and the only military duties were to provide 200 men for the border defense against the neighbouring Habsburg Empire and fortify the near city of Cividale and the fortress of Palmanova as well. The ancient and commercial street of the Natisone valley, which connected the German world to the Adriatic sea and Italy, lost its importance soon afterwards the Habsburgs inherited the county of Gorizia (1500) and conquered the "gastaldia" of Tolmino (1516); the Austrians built another street passing along the border and this caused a heavy economic damage to the whole area which became much poorer than it was before.

The Napoleonic and Austrian rule
In 1797, most of the Venetian Republic was annexed to the Habsburg Empire, including Schiavonia Veneta. The Habsburg authorities abolished the ancient privileges of the local Slav populations, as they had already done with a similar system of autonomy in neighboring Tolmin County in 1717. In 1805, the region was submitted to the Napoleonic rule, which did not restore the privileges, but replaced the old boroughs with French-style townships, led by government-appointed mayors. In 1813, the region fell again under Habsburg domain and in 1815 it was included in the Austrian administrative unit of Lombardy-Venetia. Most of the reforms introduced by the French authorities were kept. The local population fought bravely for Italian unity in 1848 and 1864. In 1866, the region became part of Italy by a referendum (won with 3687 votes against 1), with the exception of the villages of Breginj and Livek which were included in the Austrian County of Gorizia and Gradisca.

Under the Kingdom of Italy

The Italian policy was aimed to improve the quality of life, local economy, education: in the first eighteen years, schools and streets were improved five times more than the Austrian domination lasted fiftythree years. Italian remained the official one as it was in the previous centuries (under Venice, France and Austria). The local population was considered made of "Italians with a Slav origin"; the local traditions were respected and there was the need to teach a common language to be understood in the whole State. During this period, the region became a major focus of historians, linguists and ethnologists, interested in its archaic customs, language and common law. Scholars who wrote about Slavia Friulana included the Italo-Slavs Carlo Podrecca and Francesco Musoni, the Polish linguist Jan Niecisław Baudouin de Courtenay, the Slovenes Simon Rutar and Henrik Tuma.

After 1870, when Italy conquered Rome reducing the pope's territories to the Vatican City, also the Italo-Slav priests (which fought for the union to Italy in the precedent decades) started a hard political action against the new kingdom: for this reason they refused to consider themselves Italians but Slovenes. This trend became even more pronounced after the annexation of the Julian March to the Kingdom of Italy in 1920, when a large Slovene-speaking minority was included within the borders of the Italian state. The local politicians, instead, continued to support the Italian policy: this concerned both the conservatives and the progressives.

After a dozen years of Fascist regime, all public and religious use of other languages were forbidden. This feature was further emphasized by the Slovene anti-fascist and nationalist propaganda (both left-wing and conservative-Catholic), which frequently portrayed the Slavia Friulana as the symbol of Slovene resistance to Fascist Italianization, often simplifying the complex linguistic and social realities of the region. The best-known literary portrayal of the area was written in 1938 by the Slovene writer France Bevk from Gorizia in his novel "The Vicar Martin Čedermac" (Kaplan Martin Čedermac).

During World War II the Slovene partisan resistance, led by the Liberation Front of the Slovenian People, penetrated in the region. The Kobarid Republic was established as a temporary administration after the Italian armistice in early September 1943.

In early November 1943, the Nazi German forces crushed the insurgency, and incorporated the whole area into the Operational Zone Adriatic Coast. In 1944, the Italian resistance movement also became active in the mountains of Slavia Friulana. Tensions between the Yugoslav (Slovene) and Italian resistance movements rose. The Liberation Front of the Slovenian People wanted to annex the region to a Yugoslav Communist federation, while the Italian resistance was split between the Communists who partially supported the Yugoslav claims, and the Liberal-democratic who wanted Slavia Friulana to remain part of Italy.

In February 1945, the Porzus massacre occurred, in which the  communist and filo-Yugoslav Italian partisans killed several members of the Italian liberal-democratic resistance members. In May 1945 the whole area was invaded by the Yugoslav People's Army, which however withdrew a few weeks later after the British arrival. Liberal-democratic-catholic partisans, members of the Royal Army and the defeated fascist soldiers joined up together to fight the communists and the Yugoslavs.

Italian Republic

In 1945, Slavia Friulana again became an integral part of Italy. It was included in the region of Friuli-Venezia Giulia. Between 1945 and 1947, Slavia Friulana was a region on the border with the Communist Bloc, and it was listed as a special operational zone of Gladio, a clandestine NATO "stay-behind" operation in Italy after World War II, intended to counter a possible Warsaw Pact invasion of Western Europe. The activists of Gladio were mostly local members of the Alpini troops.

In the following decades, the presence of a militarized border didn't allow an economic and infrastructural development and this situation caused a widespread emigration during the same period. Europe's ideological division ignited in this area an ethnic one: local communists continued to support the Yugoslav socialist regime claiming the recognition of a Slovene minority; also a few priests continued to identify the population as Slovene. On the other hand, some locals consider themselves as Italo-slavs or nedižouci (inhabitants of the Natisone valley; singular: nedižovac) and rečanji (inhabitants of the Alberone, Erbezzo and Cosizza valleys; singular: rečanj). They claim to speak nediško, with ethnical differences by the Slovene neighbours. Although Yugoslavia started its dissolution after Josip Broz Tito died in 1980 and the cold war ended in 1989, this ethnic debate hasn't been cleared yet and it's still caged within an ideological contest.

Population trends

Many of the villages lost more than two thirds of their populations, as Slavs from Friulian Slavia moved to larger urban areas in Northern Italy, Switzerland, Belgium and Germany. In May and September 1976, two earthquakes hit Friuli, causing large scale damages.

After 1977
Although the area was largely depopulated after 1977, the political pressure was lifted after the Treaty of Osimo between Italy and Yugoslavia, but with no economic improvement. Anyway, Slovene cultural activities started to take place in the early 1980s. In the early 1990s, the first elementary and high school with Slovene as a language of instruction was established in San Pietro al Natisone, and in 2001, the Italian state recognized the local population as a Slovene minority living in the area, guaranteeing it full rights but ignoring the claims of those who consider themselves as non-Slovene. After Slovenia's entry into the European Union in 2004, the relations between the Slavia Friulana and the bordering Goriška region have intensified.

Language, culture and religion 

Most people in Slavia Friulana (considering the whole slavophone area) speak four different Slovene dialects, named after the major valleys that form those territories: first of all the Natisone Valley dialect, the Torre Valley dialect, the Resian dialect and the Iudrio Valleys. The first three are closely related to each other and Resian, instead, has its own peculiar characteristics. On the other hand, the Slovene spoken in the province of Gorizia is part of the Littoral dialect group.

Almost all of the inhabitants are fluent in Italian, which is taught in schools and present in the media and in the administration. Friulian is also widespread, especially in the municipalities of Montenars, Tarcento, Nimis, Attimis, Torreano, and Prepotto; in many villages in these municipalities, the Friulian language has already replaced Slovene as the first language of communication. Because of the lack of education in Slovene, most of the inhabitants do not master standard Slovene. Many do not understand it either, especially in the areas where the Slovenian TV and radio are not accessible, since standard Slovene is not entirely intelligible with the languages spoken in the region. They are however partially intelligible with the neighbouring Slovene dialects spoken in the Slovenian Littoral, especially the Soča and Brda dialects, which actually were parts of the ancient Venetian Schiavonia and annexed to Habsburgs' county of Gorizia in the early 19th century.

The vast majority of the people belong to the Roman Catholic Church and the religion plays an important role in the local culture. The Roman Catholic priests have traditionally been the most important promoters of the Slovene language and culture in Slavia Friulana. Anyway, the linguistic matter hasn't been clarified yet. In the late 19th century, the Polish linguist Jan Baudouin de Courtenay considered the four local languages as different Slavic ones, rich in Slavic archaisms which make them often sound closer to Serbian. He classified the four Friulian Slav groups as those of the Resia Valley, Torre Valleys, Natisone Valleys, and Judrio Valleys.

In the last decades some local politicians have been asking for a popular referendum concerning the self-ethnic definition of these people, but the project has never been possible to carry out because it has been boycotted by the most ideologized groups. The referendum itself has been recently demanded by the European Union and in the meanwhile the first scientific studies about local languages have finally been published for a transparent debate.

Slavia Friulana is known for its rich folk traditions. Numerous folk and ethno music bands come from the region, and many of them are extremely popular throughout Slovenia and the Friuli Venezia Giulia. The best-known of these bands are probably the Beneški fantje ("Venetian Lads"), which are considered to be oldest still existing Slovene band. Besides its archaic traditional music and dances, the Resia valley is also known for its folk tales, which were edited and translated into standard Slovene by the Slovene scholar Milko Matičetov and published by the largest publishing house in Slovenia, Mladinska knjiga, in 1976. They have been re-published in eight editions since, and have had a huge impact in popularizing the Friulian Slav folk culture in Slovenia.

Since the late 1980s, Slavia Friulana has also emerged as one of the major centres of high quality Slovene dialect poetry. The best-known poets from the region are Silvana Paletti, Francesco Bergnach and Marina Cernetig.

Since 1994, the artistic project Stazione di Topolò – Postaja Topolove or "Topolò Station" takes place every summer in the small village of Topolò (known as Topolove or Topoluove in the local dialect). The project, which is the most important cultural and artistic event in the region, is an attempt to bring together contemporary visual art with and the local folk traditions.

Notable people from the region 
Carlo Podrecca, historian
Francesco Musoni, ethnographer
Anton Klodič Sabladoski, philologian, linguist and poet
Aldo Specogna, Alpini Colonel, Silver Military Valour Medals
Francesco Bergnach, Slovene dialect poet
Edi Bucovaz, musician
Marina Cernetig, Slovene dialect poet
Luigi Faidutti, Friulian politician in Austria-Hungary
Gianni Osgnach, sculptor
Silvana Paletti, poet in the Resian dialect
Graziano Podrecca, fotographer
Stefano Podrecca, physician
Pietro Podrecca, author
Rudi Šimac, politician and author (from Breginj)
Jožef Školč, politician (from Breginj), founder and first president of the Liberal Democratic Party
Ivan Trinko, Roman Catholic prelate, translator and author
Natalino Božo Zuanella, priest, historian and activist
Pietro Fanna, professional soccer player
Lorenzo Crisetig, professional footballer
Roberto Chiacig, professional basket player
Tedoldi Guerino-Vojmir, journalist

See also 
Friuli
Patriarchate of Aquileia
Slovene Lands
Slovene Union
Resian dialect

Sources 
 Carlo Podrecca, Slavia italiana, Cividale 1884
 Carlo Podrecca, Slavia italiana – Polemica, Cividale 1885
 Carlo Podrecca, Le vicinìe, Cividale 1887
 Bonessa et al., Slavia friulana, Cormons 2013; you can read the text here 
 Marinelli et al., Guida delle Prealpi Giulie, Udine 1912
 Nino Špehonja, Nediška gramatika, Cormons 2012
 Nino Špehonja, Besednjak Nediško-Taljansko, Cormons 2012
 Nino Špehonja, Vocabolario Italiano-Nediško, Cormons 2012
 Giuseppe Jaculin, Gli Slavi del Natisone, Tavagnacco 1996
Bogo Grafenauer, "The Autonomy of Venetian Slovenia" in Slovenci v Italiji po drugi svetovni vojni (Ljubljana, Koper, Trieste: Cankarjeva založba, Primorski tisk, Založništvo tržaškega tiska, 1975), 105–109.
Svetozar Ilešič, "Beneška Slovenija" in Encyclopedia of Yugoslavia, ed. by Miroslav Krleža (Zagreb: Leksikografski zavod FNRJ, 1955–1971).
Simon Rutar, Beneška Slovenija (Ljubljana: Slovenska matica, 1899).
Gaetano Salvemini, Racial minorities under fascism in Italy (Chicago : The Women's International League for Peace and Freedom, 1934).
Henrik Tuma, Avtonomna uprava Beneška Slovenije (Ljubljana: Slovenski pravnik, 1933).
Sergij Vilfan, L'autonomia della Slavia Italiana nel periodo patriarcale e veneto (Trieste-San Pietro: Quaderni Nadiža, 1987).
Fran Zwitter, The Venetian Slovenes (Ljubljana: Institute for Ethnic Studies, 1946).
Tadej Koren, Beneška Slovenija po drugi svetovni vojni: fenomen paravojaških enot (Ljubljana: Univerza v Ljubljani, 2005).
Branko Marušič, Primorski čas pretekli (Koper, Trieste, Nova Gorica: Lipa – Založništvo tržaškega tiska – Goriški muzej, 1985).
Venezia, una republica ai confini (Mariano del Friuli: Edizioni della Laguna, 2004).
Faustino Nazzi, Alle origini della "Gladio": la questione della lingua slovena nella vita religiosa della Slavia Friulana nel secondo dopoguerra (Udine: La Patrie dal Friûl, 1997).
Natalino Zuanella, Gli anni bui della Slavia: attività delle organizzazioni segrete nel Friuli orientale (Cividale del Friuli: Società Cooperativa Editrice Dom, 1996).

References

External links 

Lintver – Slavia Friulana website 

Geography of Friuli-Venezia Giulia
Geographical, historical and cultural regions of Italy
Former states and territories in Slovenia
Friuli-Venezia Giulia